Saliu Popoola (born 7 August 1994) is a Nigerian professional footballer who plays as a midfielder for Moroccan club Wydad Fès. He is also a Nigerian international.

Measuring only 1.57 m, he was considered, in 2015, to be the third smallest professional player in the world. With the Nigeria U23 team, he won the bronze medal at the 2016 Summer Olympics.

Career
Popoola joined FC Metz in August 2012, after a successful trial with the team. He would play for the reserves in the CFA. The following season, he made two appearances in the Coupe de France, but none in Ligue 2 where the Metz first team played.

In lack of playing time, he was sent on a two-season loan to Belgian club Seraing for two seasons, until June 2016. With a height of only 1.57 m, he was then the smallest professional player playing in Belgium. With Seraing, he made 51 appearances in the Belgian second division, scoring 4 goals. Most notably, he scored a brace against Heist on 29 November 2015, which proved to be the key to the 5–2 win.

In September 2016, having still not made a league appearance for the Metz first-team, he terminated his contract with the club by mutual consent.

Honours
Nigeria U23
 Olympic Bronze Medal: 2016

References

External links

 
 
 Saliu Popoola Interview

1994 births
Living people
Yoruba sportspeople
Sportspeople from Lagos
Association football midfielders
Nigerian footballers
Nigerian expatriate footballers
Nigerian expatriate sportspeople in Belgium
Nigerian expatriate sportspeople in France
Nigerian expatriate sportspeople in Morocco
Expatriate footballers in Belgium
Expatriate footballers in France
Expatriate footballers in Morocco
Footballers at the 2016 Summer Olympics
Olympic footballers of Nigeria
Ligue 1 players
Challenger Pro League players
FC Metz players
R.F.C. Seraing (1922) players
Ittihad Khemisset players
Medalists at the 2016 Summer Olympics
Olympic bronze medalists for Nigeria
Olympic medalists in football
Wydad de Fès players